Marina Correia Lima (born September 17, 1955) is a Brazilian singer and songwriter. She is a prominent female pioneer of Brazilian rock music.

Career 
Marina Lima began composing songs at age 17, and first achieved
major success with the 1984 album Fullgás, which included the hit singles "Fullgás", "Me Chama" (written by Lobão), "Veneno" and "Mesmo que Seja Eu" (an Erasmo Carlos cover).

In 1986 she released the first home video concert by a Brazilian artist, "Todas Ao Vivo", which chronicled the tour in support of her 1985 album "Todas" and included several of her previous hits as well as backstage interviews.

In the 90s she continued recording highly praised albums such as “O Chamado” and Abrigo”.

After a long break from the stage, Lima finally returned to prominence with the release of concert and live album “Sissi na Sua”.

In 2003 she recorded her Acústico MTV (the Brazilian equivalent of the MTV Unplugged series), which spawned two top 10 hit singles (the new track "Sugar" and a reworked version of her 1984 hit "Fullgas") and became her best selling album in over a decade. The DVD (the first of her career) was also one of the year's best sellers.

Personal life 
In an interview, she declared herself as bisexual.

Discography

DVDs 
 2003 Acústico MTV

External links 
 Official website

References 

1955 births
Living people
21st-century Brazilian women singers
20th-century Brazilian women singers
Brazilian women singer-songwriters
LGBT people in Latin music
Women in Latin music
Bisexual women
Brazilian LGBT singers
Brazilian LGBT songwriters
Bisexual singers
Bisexual songwriters
20th-century Brazilian LGBT people
21st-century Brazilian LGBT people
Brazilian bisexual people